VA-1 has the following meanings:
State Route 1 (Virginia)
Virginia's 1st congressional district